, also known as Ghosts at School, is a 2000 Japanese anime series directed by Noriyuki Abe and produced by Pierrot. The 20-episode series was adapted from Tōru Tsunemitsu's eponymous novel series. The series is based around the lives of five school children—Satsuki Miyanoshita, Keiichirō Miyanoshita, Hajime Aoyama, Reo Kakinoki, and Momoko Koigakubo—who exorcise the spirits that are awakened in, and haunt their hometown as a consequence of industrialization.

Gakkō no Kaidan aired from October 22, 2000 to March 25, 2001 on Fuji Television. The episodes were later released in seven VHS and DVD compilations by Aniplex; a DVD box set was released in 2004. The series' soundtrack was also released by Aniplex in 2001. An episode titled  – about the ghost of a woman who was brutally murdered by her husband – was cancelled after complaints from parents of children with cleft lip and palate disorders. DVD compilations exclude the episode.

At the first Onicon, in October 2004, Matt Greenfield, the co-founder of ADV Films, announced that they had licensed the series for an English dub. Although the basic plot-line was kept intact in the English version, ADV Films' replaced the original dialogue with a more comedic version, which made references to pop culture. Five DVD volumes of the dubbed version were released from 2005 through 2006; the original Japanese track and subtitles were also included. A DVD box set, containing the full English series, went on sale in January 2008. In Asia, Animax  aired the series in 2006 as Ghosts at School. The series uses only two pieces of theme music.  by Hysteric Blue played as the opening theme song of the show and "Sexy Sexy", by Cascade was the closing theme song.

Background
Gakkō no Kaidan was adapted from the eponymous film, which was based on the novels written by Tōru Tsunemitsu. A middle school teacher by profession, Tsunemitsu started drafting the series in 1985, inspired by the stories circulating around the city. He began by listening to stories that his students told him, compiled them into a book and presented the collection to the publisher Kodansha, with some modifications to the language so that children could read and understand them. Kodansha published 9 volumes of the title from 1990 through 1997 and the work quickly became a best-seller. The anime series was produced in 2000, by Studio Pierrot, and directed by Noriyuki Abe. The series was planned by Kenji Shimizu, Ryūzō Shirakawa, and Yuji Nunokawa. The producers were Yuriko Nakamura, Hideo Katsumata, and Ken Hagino. Masaya Ōnishi designed the characters and Shigenori Takada was the art director. The sound was directed by Abe; sound effects were done by Masako Mutō, produced by Zack Promotion, and recorded at Seion Studio. The background score of the series was composed by Kaoru Wada.

Episode list

References
General

Specific

Ghost Stories
Gakkō no Kaidan
2000 television episodes
2001 television episodes